Scottish Australians are ‌‍‍‍‍residents of Australia who are fully or partially of Scottish descent.

According to the 2021 Australian census, 130,060 Australian residents were born in Scotland, while 2,176,777 claimed Scottish ancestry, either alone or in combination with another ancestry.

History
The links between Scotland and Australia stretch back to the first British expedition of the Endeavour under command of Lieutenant James Cook who was himself the son of a Scottish ploughman. Cook navigated and charted the east coast of Australia, making first landfall at Botany Bay on 29 April 1770. His reports in Cook's expedition would lead to British settlement of the continent, and during the voyage Cook also named two groups of Pacific islands in honour of Scotland: New Caledonia and the New Hebrides. The first European to die on Australian soil was a Scot; Forbey Sutherland from Orkney, an able seaman died on 30 April 1770 of consumption and was the first to be buried on the colony by Captain Cook, who named Sutherland Point at Botany Bay in his honour.

Colonial period
The first Scottish settlers arrived in Australia with the First Fleet in 1788, including three of the first six Governors of New South Wales John Hunter, Lachlan Macquarie (often referred to as the father of Australia) and Thomas Brisbane. The majority of Scots arriving in the early colonial period were convicts: 8,207 Scottish convicts, of the total 150,000 transported to Australia, made up about 5% of the convict population. The Scottish courts were unwilling to punish crimes deemed to be lesser offences in Scots Law by deportation to Australia. Scottish law was considered more humane for lesser offences than the English and Irish legal systems. Although Scottish convicts had a poor reputation, most were convicted of minor property offences and represented a broad cross-section of Scotland's working classes. As such, they brought a range of useful skills to the colonies.

From 1793–1795, a group of political prisoners later called the 'Scottish Martyrs', were transported to the colonies. They were not all Scots, but had been tried in Scotland. Their plight as victims of oppression was widely reported and the subsequent escape of one of them, Thomas Muir, in 1796 caused a sensation and inspired the poetry of Robert Burns. The majority of immigrants, 'free settlers', in the late 18th century were Lowlanders from prominent wealthy families. Engineers like Andrew McDougall and John Bowman arrived with experience in building corn mills, while others were drawn to Australia by the prospects of trade. William Douglas Campbell, Robert Campbell, Charles Hook, Alexander Berry Laird of the Shoalhaven, were some of the first merchants drawn to the colonies.

At this time, several Scottish regiments were recorded in the colonies: Macquarie's unit or the 73rd Regiment, the Royal North British Fusiliers, and the King's Own Scottish Borderers. Three of the Deputy Commissaries-General (the highest rank in the colony) from 1813 to 1835 were Scots: David Allan, William Lithgow, Stewart.

By 1830, 15.11% of the colonies' total population were Scots, which increased by the middle of the century to 25,000, or 20-25% of the total population. The Australian Gold Rush of the 1850s provided a further impetus for Scottish migration: in the 1850s 90,000 Scots immigrated, far higher than other British or Irish populations at the time. Literacy rates of the Scottish immigrants ran at 90-95%. By the 1830s a growing number of Scots from the poorer working classes joined the diaspora. Immigrants included skilled builders, tradesmen, engineers, tool-makers and printers. They settled in commercial and industrial cities, Sydney, Adelaide, Hobart and Melbourne. The migration of skilled workers increased, including bricklayers, carpenters, joiners, and stonemasons. They settled in the colonies of Victoria, New South Wales, South Australia and Tasmania.

In the 1840s, Scots-born immigrants constituted 12 percent of the Australian population. Out of the 1.3 million migrants from Britain to Australia in the period from 1861–1914, 13.5 percent were Scots. Much settlement followed the Highland Potato Famine, Highland Clearances and the Lowland Clearances of the mid-19th century. By 1860 Scots made up 50% of the ethnic composition of Western Victoria, Adelaide, Penola and Naracoorte. Other settlements in New south Wales included New England, the Hunter Valley and the Illawarra.

Their preponderance in pastoral industries on the Australian frontier and in various colonial administrative roles, meant that some Scottish migrants were involved in the injustices against Indigenous Australians throughout the colonial period, including: the dispossession of the indigenous from their lands, the creation of discriminatory administration regimes, and in killings and massacres.

Throughout the 19th century, Scots invested heavily in the industries of the Australian colonies. In the 1820s, the Australian Company of Edinburgh & Leith exported a variety of goods to Australia, but a lack of return cargo led to the company's termination in 1831. The Scottish Australian Investment Company was formed in Aberdeen in 1840, and soon became one of the chief businesses in the colonies, making substantial investments in the pastoral and mining industries. Smaller companies, such as George Russel's Clyde Company and Niel & Company, also had a significant presence in the colonies. Before the 1893 Australian financial crisis, Scotland was the main source of private British loans to Australia.

20th century
A steady rate of Scottish immigration continued into the 20th century, with substantial numbers of Scots continuing to arrive after 1945. Between 1910 and 1914, around 9000 Scots arrived each year, and in 1921 the Scottish population of Australia was 109,000. Due to economic decline in Scotland after the First World War, there was an over-representation of Scots among British migrants to Australia during the interwar period, and by 1933 there were 132,000 Scottish migrants living in Australia.

By the 1920s and 1930s, a majority of Scottish migrants in Australia were living in Victoria and New South Wales. The urban working-class background of many British migrants to Australia in the early 20th century meant that Scots were most likely to settle in industrial portside suburbs, especially in Melbourne and Sydney, where they made notable contributions to the shipbuilding industry. In the late-19th and early-20th century, Scottish-born workers had a significant influence in the labour movement, and played key roles in trade unions and the Australian Labor Party, as well as becoming leaders in the Communist Party of Australia. In 1928, a significant delegation of Scottish Australians to Scotland was influential in the opening of a direct trade route between Australia and Glasgow, and by 1932 traders on the Clyde had reported a three-fold increase in imports from Australia and New Zealand.

Today, a strong cultural Scottish presence is evident in the Highland games, dance, Tartan day celebrations, Clan and Gaelic-speaking societies found throughout modern Australia. In the early 2000s, the number of Australians claiming to have Scottish ancestry increased almost three-fold; the majority of those who claim Scottish ancestry are third or later generation Australians.

Demographics

2011 Census
According to the 2011 Australian census 133,432 Australian residents were born in Scotland, which was 0.6% of the Australian population. This is the fourth most commonly nominated ancestry and represents over 8.3% of the total population of Australia.

2006 Census
At the 2006 Census 130,205 Australian residents stated that they were born in Scotland.  Of these 80,604 had Australian citizenship. The majority of residents, 83,503, had arrived in Australia in 1979 or earlier.

Culture

Some aspects of Scottish culture can be found in Australia:

 Bagpiping and pipe bands.
 Burns Supper
 Ceilidhs
 Hogmanay, the Scottish New Year
 Presbyterianism - the majority of Scottish settlers were Presbyterian, some were Roman Catholic or Episcopalian.
 Tartan, some regions of Australia have their own tartan.
 Tartan Day, in Australia, falls on 1 July, the date of the repeal proclamation in 1792 of the Act of Proscription that banned the wearing of Scottish national dress.

Highland gatherings 
Highland gatherings are popular in Australia.  Notable gatherings include:
Bundanoon, New South Wales established in 1976, claimed to be one of the largest Highland Gatherings in the Southern Hemisphere, and the biggest in Australia.
Maclean, New South Wales first held in 1904. A gathering that attracts pipe bands from all over Australia and includes massed bands, dancing and a street parade.  
Maryborough, Victoria held since 1857 on New Year's Day

Scottish schools
The Scots in Australia started a number of schools, some of which are state run, and some of which are private:

 The Scots College, in Bellevue Hill, Sydney, New South Wales.
 Presbyterian Ladies' College PLC In Croydon, New South Wales.
 The Scots PGC College, in Warwick, Queensland, formed by the merger of The Scots College, Warwick and The Presbyterian Girls' College.
 The Scots School Albury, in Albury, New South Wales.
 The Scots School, Bathurst, in Bathurst, New South Wales.
 Presbyterian Ladies' College, Armidale PLCA in Armidale, New South Wales.
 Scotch College, Adelaide, in Torrens Park and Mitcham, South Australia.
 Scotch College, Melbourne, in Hawthorn, Victoria.
 Scotch College, Perth, in Swanbourne, Western Australia.
Presbyterian Ladies' College, Perth, in Peppermint Grove, Western Australia
 Scotch College, Launceston, in Tasmania; amalgamated with Oakburn College in 1979 to form Scotch Oakburn College.
 Seymour College, Adelaide, South Australia.
 Bagpipe Uni, Melbourne (George), in Victoria Australia

Scottish placenames

In Australia, Scottish names make up 17 per cent of all non-Indigenous placenames. Many are of Lowland origins, but Highland names are also common in areas of concentrated Highland settlement. There are also many other landscape features, properties, and streets in Australia with Scottish origins.

Notable Scottish placenames in Australia include:
Western Australia
Perth
Albany
Marvel Loch, Western Australia
Stirling Range
New South Wales
Maclean
Ben Lomond
Glen Innes
Northern Territory
MacDonnell Ranges
Queensland
Brisbane (Thomas Brisbane)
South Australia
St Kilda
Stirling
Glenelg
Tasmania
Ben Lomond
Lake Mackintosh
Suburbs of Hobart-Glenorchy-
Glenorchy & City of Glenorchy
Victoria
St. Kilda

Places named after Lachlan Macquarie

Many places in Australia have been named in Macquarie's honour (some of these were named by Macquarie himself).  They include:

At the time of his governorship or shortly thereafter:
Macquarie Island between Tasmania and Antarctica.
Lake Macquarie on the coast of New South Wales between Sydney and Newcastle renamed after Macquarie in 1826.
Macquarie River  a significant inland river in New South Wales which passes Bathurst, Wellington, Dubbo and Warren before entering the Macquarie Marshes and the Barwon River.
Lachlan River, another significant river in New South Wales
Port Macquarie, a city at the mouth of the Hastings River on the North Coast, New South Wales.
Macquarie Pass, a route traversing the escarpment between the Illawarra district and the Southern Highlands district of New South Wales.
Macquarie Rivulet, a river 23 kilometers long which rises near Robertson, New South Wales and drains into Lake Illawarra.
In Tasmania:
Macquarie Harbour on the west coast of Tasmania.
Lachlan a small town named by Sir John Franklin in 1837.
Macquarie River.
Macquarie Hill, formerly known as Mount Macquarie, in Wingecarribee Shire, Southern Highlands, New South Wales.
Macquarie Pass, north-east of Robertson, New South Wales.
 Lachlan Swamps, in Centennial Parklands.

Many years after his governorship:

Macquarie Park and Macquarie Links, suburbs of Sydney.
Macquarie, a suburb of Canberra, Australia.
Division of Macquarie, one of the first 75 Divisions of the Australian House of Representatives created for the Australian Parliament in 1901.

Notable Australians of Scottish descent

See also 

Scottish diaspora
Anglo-Celtic Australians
Scottish placenames in Australia

References

Further reading
 Prentis, Malcolm D.  (2008), The Scots in Australia, University of New South Wales Press, Sydney, 
 Wilkie, Benjamin (2017), The Scots in Australia 1788-1938, Boydell & Brewer, Woodbridge, 
 Richards, Eric. Britannia's children: emigration from England, Scotland, Wales and Ireland since 1600 (A&C Black, 2004) online.

External links
 The Scottish Australian (Scottish Australian history blog) 
 Scottish Australian Heritage Council
  Scotland's Links with Australia and New Zealand
 Scottish Emigration Database
  (History of Scots in Sydney)

European Australian